Radio Rovers is the official radio station of the English Championship football side Blackburn Rovers FC.  It was launched at Ewood Park on 30 October 1993 and was the first dedicated football club radio station in the United Kingdom.

The studio is located in the Darwen End one of the stands at Blackburns Ground Ewood Park.  The station only airs on Blackburn match days.

The broadcast includes pre-match build up, music, team news, and manager comments before the match, full commentary during the match and post-match analysis, interviews, and viewer phone-ins after. The channel begins broadcasting 4 hours prior to kick off, and a typical day covers 7 hours on-air

The station broadcasts a 'free to air' service under an OFCOM RSL (restricted service licence) on 1404 kHz am around Blackburn. It is available anywhere in the world via the club's official website rovers.co.uk – for which you pay an annual subscription and is also available for disabled fans inside the ground on match days.

Gerald Jackson, seen as the voice of Radio Rovers, is a longtime presenter of the show. He is also a local radio presenter for BBC Radio Lancashire. Matthew Sillitoe replaced Gerald Jackson as presenter at the start of the 2014–15 season and has continued to host the broadcast in its familiar format.

References

Radio stations in Lancashire
Blackburn Rovers F.C.
Sports radio stations in the United Kingdom
1993 establishments in the United Kingdom